The 1978 Cincinnati Bengals season was the franchise's 9th season in the National Football League, and the 11th overall.

Ken Anderson missed the first four games with a broken bone in his right hand, and Homer Rice replaced Bill Johnson as head coach after the Bengals started 0–5. The team dipped to marks of 0–8 and 1–12 before rebounding under Rice to win the last three games. In the season finale, the Bengals blasted Cleveland, 48–16, setting series records for points and victory margin.

Offseason

NFL draft

Personnel

Staff

Roster

Regular season

Schedule

Note: Intra-division opponents are in bold text.

Standings

Team leaders
Passing: Ken Anderson (319 Att, 173 Comp, 2219 Yds, 54.2 Pct, 10 TD, 22 Int, 58.0 Rating) 
Rushing: Pete Johnson (180 Att, 762 Yds, 4.2 Avg, 50 Long, 7 TD) 
Receiving: Isaac Curtis (47 Rec, 737 Yds, 15.7 Avg, 57 Long, 3 TD) 
Scoring: Chris Bahr, 74 points (16 FG; 26 PAT)

Awards and records

Pro Bowl selection
For the first time in team history, the Bengals did not have any players selected to the Pro Bowl.

References

External links
 1978 Cincinnati Bengals at Pro-Football-Reference.com

Cincinnati Bengals
Cincinnati Bengals seasons
Cinc